Wu Chengying (Pinyin: Wú Chéngyīng; born 21 April 1975 in Shanghai) is a Chinese former international football player who spent the majority of his career at Shanghai Shenhua where he won the league and Chinese FA Cup before moving to Shanghai International for a then Chinese record fee of 13,000,000 RMB in 2003. Internationally he was a member of the Chinese national team where he participated in the 1996 and 2000 AFC Asian Cup as well also the 2002 FIFA World Cup.

Playing career
Wu Chengying emerged with future Chinese internationals Shen Si, Xie Hui and Qi Hong form Shanghai Shenhua where he was predominantly used in the left back position. During his spell at Shanghai Shenhua the team claimed the 1995 Chinese Jia-A League title and the 1998 Chinese FA Cup. In February 1998, he was loaned to Dalian Wanda for half a month for the 1997–98 Asian Club Championship and scored a goal against Pohang Steelers. He attracted the interests of Italian side Calcio Como in January 2002 but the Serie A club failed to reach an agreement with Shanghai Shenhua. Wu Chengying instead joined Shanghai International later in 2003 for 13,000,000 RMB, which made him the highest Chinese transfer ever in Chinese football history. At Shanghai International he would see them come second in the 2003 league season and third in the following campaign. When his contract expired at the end of the 2006 league season, Wu decided to announce his retirement from playing.

International career
After his performances for Shanghai Shenhua saw him win the league title he was included on the squad that went to the 1996 AFC Asian Cup and became a regular within the team. During Bora Milutinović's reign as the Chinese head coach Wu Chengying became China's first choice left back despite having an indifferent relationship with several regular players such as Ou Chuliang and Li Jinyu, who described him as extremely introverted. Despite his indifferent relationship with his teammates Wu was a regular starter for the national team playing in the 2000 AFC Asian Cup and 2002 FIFA World Cup until Bora Milutinović's reign as the Chinese national team ended.

Career statistics

International goals
Scores and results list China's goal tally first.

Honours

Club
Shanghai Shenhua
 Chinese Jia-A League: 1995
 Chinese FA Cup: 1998

Individual
Asian Goal of the Month: February 1998

References

External links
 

1975 births
Living people
Chinese footballers
Footballers from Shanghai
China international footballers
2002 FIFA World Cup players
1996 AFC Asian Cup players
2000 AFC Asian Cup players
Shanghai Shenhua F.C. players
Beijing Renhe F.C. players
Dalian Shide F.C. players
Chinese Super League players
Association football defenders